The Flint Spirits were a professional hockey team in Flint, Michigan from 1985 to 1990, and played their home games at the IMA Sports Arena. They were a part of the International Hockey League and replaced the recently departed Flint Generals team. They compiled an overall record of 162–220–28. Prior to the 1990–91 season, the original Fort Wayne Komets were moved to Albany, New York, and a group from Fort Wayne, Indiana, purchased the Spirits and relocated them to Fort Wayne in time to begin the season.

The Spirits were once an affiliate of the New York Rangers.

Season-by-season results

Notable NHL alumni
The Flint Spirits sent numerous players to the NHL in their five years of existence. The biggest names include:

John Cullen, co-winner of the 1987–88 Gary F. Longman Memorial Trophy with Saginaw's Ed Belfour.
Ronnie Stern
Darcy Wakaluk
Rob Zamuner
Mike Richter
Paul Broten
Peter Laviolette
Jayson More
Kevin Miller

External links
Flint Spirits statistics at The Internet Hockey Database

Ice hockey teams in Flint, Michigan
International Hockey League (1945–2001) teams
Professional ice hockey teams in Michigan
Defunct ice hockey teams in the United States
Ice hockey clubs established in 1985
Sports clubs disestablished in 1990
1985 establishments in Michigan
Toronto Maple Leafs minor league affiliates
Buffalo Sabres minor league affiliates
New York Rangers minor league affiliates
Detroit Red Wings minor league affiliates
Philadelphia Flyers minor league affiliates
Vancouver Canucks minor league affiliates
New Jersey Devils minor league affiliates
1990 disestablishments in Michigan